Ross Township is a township in Monroe County, Pennsylvania, United States. The population was 5,464 at the 2020 census. Ross Township is one of 16 townships in Monroe County.

History
Ross Common Manor was listed on the National Register of Historic Places in 1978.

2013 shooting

On August 5, 2013, three people were killed, and at least three were in critical condition in a shooting at a township supervisors' monthly meeting after 7:30 p.m. EDT at the Ross Township building. The gunman, 59-year-old Rockne Newell, was tackled by West End Open Space Commission executive director, Bernie Kozen, and Newell was shot with his own gun. He was taken to the hospital and released into police custody. Newell approached the building armed with a long gun and opened fire through the windows. Up to eighteen people were inside at the time. Newell had an ongoing dispute with the Ross Township board of supervisors and they repeatedly told him to clean his land.

Geography
According to the United States Census Bureau, the township has a total area of 22.7 square miles (58.7 km2), of which 22.6 square miles (58.6 km2)  is land and 0.04 square mile (0.1 km2)  (0.18%) is water. It is drained by the Aquashicola Creek westward into the Lehigh River. Blue Mountain forms its natural southern boundary. Its villages include Ross Common, Rossland, and Saylorsburg (also in Hamilton Township).

Neighboring municipalities
Eldred Township (west)
Polk Township (tangent to the northwest)
Chestnuthill Township (north)
Hamilton Township (east)
Plainfield Township, Northampton County (southeast)
Bushkill Township, Northampton County (south)
Moore Township, Northampton County (southwest)

Demographics

As of the census of 2000, there were 5,435 people, 1,875 households, and 1,518 families residing in the township.  The population density was 240.3 people per square mile (92.8/km2).  There were 1,974 housing units at an average density of 87.3/sq mi (33.7/km2).  The racial makeup of the township was 96.61% White, 1.09% African American, 0.07% Native American, 0.39% Asian, 0.77% from other races, and 1.07% from two or more races. Hispanic or Latino of any race were 2.19% of the population.

There were 1,875 households, out of which 40.1% had children under the age of 18 living with them, 69.9% were married couples living together, 6.9% had a female householder with no husband present, and 19.0% were non-families. 13.0% of all households were made up of individuals, and 3.9% had someone living alone who was 65 years of age or older.  The average household size was 2.87 and the average family size was 3.16.

In the township the population was spread out, with 28.6% under the age of 18, 5.7% from 18 to 24, 31.0% from 25 to 44, 25.0% from 45 to 64, and 9.7% who were 65 years of age or older.  The median age was 38 years. For every 100 females, there were 102.7 males.  For every 100 females age 18 and over, there were 100.8 males.

The median income for a household in the township was $48,750, and the median income for a family was $52,639. Males had a median income of $40,716 versus $28,750 for females. The per capita income for the township was $20,002.  About 5.0% of families and 7.2% of the population were below the poverty line, including 7.8% of those under age 18 and 5.8% of those age 65 or over.

Climate

According to the Trewartha climate classification system, Ross Township has a Temperate Continental climate (Dc) with warm summers (b), cold winters (o) and year-around precipitation (Dcbo). Dcbo climates are characterized by at least one month having an average mean temperature ≤ , four to seven months with an average mean temperature ≥ , all months with an average mean temperature <  and no significant precipitation difference between seasons. Although most summer days are slightly humid in Ross Township, episodes of heat and high humidity can occur with heat index values > . July is the peak month for thunderstorm activity which correlates with the average warmest month of the year. The average wettest month is September which correlates with tropical storm remnants during the peak of the Atlantic hurricane season. Episodes of extreme cold and wind can occur with wind chill values < . The average snowiest month is January which correlates with the average coldest month of the year. Ice storms and large snowstorms depositing ≥  of snow occur once every couple of years, particularly during nor’easters from December through March.

Transportation

Pennsylvania Route 33 is the only numbered highway serving Ross Township. It briefly crosses the eastern corner of the township, but the nearest interchanges are in neighboring townships. Main thoroughfares within the township include Kunkletown Road, Mount Eaton Road, Old Route 115, Smith Gap Road and Weir Lake Road.

Ecology

According to the A. W. Kuchler U.S. potential natural vegetation types, Ross Township would have a dominant vegetation type of Appalachian Oak (104) with a dominant vegetation form of Eastern Hardwood Forest (25). The peak spring bloom typically occurs in late-April and peak fall color usually occurs in mid-October.

References

Populated places established in 1770
Townships in Monroe County, Pennsylvania
1770 establishments in Pennsylvania
Townships in Pennsylvania